Kavaĺskaja Slabada is a Minsk Metro station. It is located at the intersection of Žukoŭskaha and Varanianskaha streets. The station was opened 6 November, 2020.

Gallery

References

Minsk Metro stations
Railway stations opened in 2020